The following is an alphabetical list of all 723 species of Selaginella that are accepted by Plants of the World Online .

A

 Selaginella aboriginalis 
 Selaginella acanthonota 
 Selaginella acanthostachys 
 Selaginella achotalensis 
 Selaginella aculeatifolia 
 Selaginella acutifolia 
 Selaginella adunca 
 Selaginella aenea 
 Selaginella agioneuma 
 Selaginella aitchisonii 
 Selaginella alampeta 
 Selaginella albociliata 
 Selaginella albolineata 
 Selaginella alligans 
 Selaginella alopecuroides 
 Selaginella alstonii 
 Selaginella altheae 
 Selaginella alutacea 
 Selaginella amazonica 
 Selaginella amblyphylla 
 Selaginella anaclasta 
 Selaginella anceps 
 Selaginella andrewsii 
 Selaginella angustifolia 
 Selaginella angustiramea 
 Selaginella apoda 
 Selaginella apoensis 
 Selaginella applanata 
 Selaginella arbuscula 
 Selaginella arbusculoides 
 Selaginella arenaria 
 Selaginella arenicola 
 Selaginella argentea 
 Selaginella aristata 
 Selaginella arizonica 
 Selaginella armata 
 Selaginella arrecta 
 Selaginella arsenei 
 Selaginella arsiclada 
 Selaginella arthritica 
 Selaginella articulata 
 Selaginella ascillifolia 
 Selaginella asperula 
 Selaginella asplundii 
 Selaginella asprella 
 Selaginella atimonanensis 
 Selaginella atirrensis 
 Selaginella auquieri 
 Selaginella auriculata 
 Selaginella australiensis 
 Selaginella axillifolia 
 Selaginella ayitiensis

B

 Selaginella bahiensis 
 Selaginella balansae 
 Selaginella balfourii 
 Selaginella bamleri 
 Selaginella banksii 
 Selaginella barnebyana 
 Selaginella basipilosa 
 Selaginella beccariana 
 Selaginella behrmanniana 
 Selaginella beitelii 
 Selaginella bemarahensis 
 Selaginella bernoullii 
 Selaginella bifida 
 Selaginella biformis 
 Selaginella bigelovii 
 Selaginella birarensis 
 Selaginella bisulcata 
 Selaginella blepharodella 
 Selaginella blepharophylla 
 Selaginella bluuensis 
 Selaginella bodinieri 
 Selaginella bombycina 
 Selaginella boninensis 
 Selaginella boomii 
 Selaginella borealis 
 Selaginella boschai 
 Selaginella bracei 
 Selaginella brachyblepharis 
 Selaginella braunii 
 Selaginella breedlovei 
 Selaginella brevifolia 
 Selaginella brevipes 
 Selaginella breweriana 
 Selaginella breynii 
 Selaginella breynioides 
 Selaginella brigitteana 
 Selaginella brisbanensis 
 Selaginella brooksii 
 Selaginella bryophila 
 Selaginella bryopteris 
 Selaginella buchholzii 
 Selaginella buergersiana 
 Selaginella burbidgei 
 Selaginella burkei

C

 Selaginella cabrerensis 
 Selaginella caffrorum 
 Selaginella calceolata 
 Selaginella calcicola 
 Selaginella calostachya 
 Selaginella calosticha 
 Selaginella caluffii 
 Selaginella canaliculata 
 Selaginella cardiophylla 
 Selaginella carinata 
 Selaginella carioi 
 Selaginella carnea 
 Selaginella carnerosana 
 Selaginella cataphracta 
 Selaginella cataractarum 
 Selaginella cathedrifolia 
 Selaginella caudata 
 Selaginella cavernaria 
 Selaginella cavifolia 
 Selaginella cesatii 
 Selaginella chaetoloma 
 Selaginella chaii 
 Selaginella cheiromorpha 
 Selaginella chevalieri 
 Selaginella chiapensis 
 Selaginella chionoloma 
 Selaginella christii 
 Selaginella chrysocaulos 
 Selaginella chrysoleuca 
 Selaginella chrysorrhizos 
 Selaginella chuweimingii 
 Selaginella ciliaris 
 Selaginella cinerascens 
 Selaginella coarctata 
 Selaginella cochleata 
 Selaginella commutata 
 Selaginella concinna 
 Selaginella conduplicata 
 Selaginella conferta 
 Selaginella confusa 
 Selaginella congoensis 
 Selaginella contigua 
 Selaginella convoluta 
 Selaginella coonooriana 
 Selaginella copelandii 
 Selaginella corallina 
 Selaginella cordifolia 
 Selaginella coriaceifolia 
 Selaginella correae 
 Selaginella corrugis 
 Selaginella crassipes 
 Selaginella crinita 
 Selaginella cristalensis 
 Selaginella cruciformis 
 Selaginella culverwellii 
 Selaginella cumingiana 
 Selaginella cuneata 
 Selaginella cuprea 
 Selaginella cupressina 
 Selaginella curtisii 
 Selaginella cyclophylla

D

 Selaginella dahlii 
 Selaginella daozhenensis 
 Selaginella darmandvillei 
 Selaginella dasyloma 
 Selaginella davidii 
 Selaginella decipiens 
 Selaginella decomposita 
 Selaginella decurrens 
 Selaginella deflexa 
 Selaginella delicatissima 
 Selaginella delicatula 
 Selaginella dendricola 
 Selaginella densa 
 Selaginella densifolia 
 Selaginella denticulata 
 Selaginella denudata 
 Selaginella devolii 
 Selaginella dianzhongensis 
 Selaginella dielsii 
 Selaginella diffusa 
 Selaginella digitata 
 Selaginella distachya 
 Selaginella distans 
 Selaginella doederleinii 
 Selaginella dolichoclada 
 Selaginella dorsicola 
 Selaginella dosedlae 
 Selaginella douglasii 
 Selaginella dregei 
 Selaginella drepanophylla 
 Selaginella x dualis

E

 Selaginella eatonii 
 Selaginella echinata 
 Selaginella eclipes 
 Selaginella ecuadoriana 
 Selaginella effusa 
 Selaginella elegantissima 
 Selaginella elmeri 
 Selaginella engleri 
 Selaginella epipubens 
 Selaginella epirrhizos 
 Selaginella erectifolia 
 Selaginella eremophila 
 Selaginella erythropus 
 Selaginella eschscholzii 
 Selaginella estrellensis 
 Selaginella eublepharis 
 Selaginella euclimax 
 Selaginella eurynota 
 Selaginella exaltata 
 Selaginella exasperata 
 Selaginella exilis 
 Selaginella expansa 
 Selaginella extensa

F

 Selaginella falcata 
 Selaginella fenixii 
 Selaginella filicaulis 
 Selaginella finitima 
 Selaginella finium 
 Selaginella firmula 
 Selaginella firmuloides 
 Selaginella fissidentoides 
 Selaginella flabellata 
 Selaginella flabellum 
 Selaginella flacca 
 Selaginella flagellata 
 Selaginella flexuosa 
 Selaginella fragilis 
 Selaginella fragillima 
 Selaginella frondosa 
 Selaginella fruticulosa 
 Selaginella fuertesii 
 Selaginella fulcrata 
 Selaginella fulvicaulis 
 Selaginella furcillifolia

G

 Selaginella ganguliana 
 Selaginella gastrophylla 
 Selaginella gaudichaudiana 
 Selaginella geniculata 
 Selaginella germinans 
 Selaginella gigantea 
 Selaginella gioiae 
 Selaginella glossophylla 
 Selaginella goudotiana 
 Selaginella grabowskyi 
 Selaginella gracilis 
 Selaginella gracillima 
 Selaginella grallipes 
 Selaginella grandis 
 Selaginella griffithii 
 Selaginella grisea 
 Selaginella guatemalensis 
 Selaginella guihaia 
 Selaginella gynostachya 
 Selaginella gypsophila

H

 Selaginella haematodes 
 Selaginella haenkeana 
 Selaginella hainanensis 
 Selaginella hallieri 
 Selaginella hansenii 
 Selaginella harrisii 
 Selaginella hartii 
 Selaginella hartwegiana 
 Selaginella helferi 
 Selaginella helicoclada 
 Selaginella hellwigii 
 Selaginella helvetica 
 Selaginella hemicardia 
 Selaginella heterodonta 
 Selaginella heterostachys 
 Selaginella hewittii 
 Selaginella hildebrandtii 
 Selaginella hindsii 
 Selaginella hirsuta 
 Selaginella hirtifolia 
 Selaginella hispida 
 Selaginella hochreutineri 
 Selaginella hoffmannii 
 Selaginella hollrungii 
 Selaginella homaliae 
 Selaginella hordeiformis 
 Selaginella horizontalis 
 Selaginella hosei 
 Selaginella huehuetenangensis 
 Selaginella humboldtiana 
 Selaginella hyalogramma

I

 Selaginella idiospora 
 Selaginella illecebrosa 
 Selaginella imbricans 
 Selaginella imbricata 
 Selaginella inaequalifolia 
 Selaginella indica 
 Selaginella ingens 
 Selaginella integrifolia 
 Selaginella intermedia 
 Selaginella intertexta 
 Selaginella involvens 
 Selaginella iridescens 
 Selaginella ivanii

J

 Selaginella jacquemontii 
 Selaginella jagorii 
 Selaginella jiulongensis 
 Selaginella jungermannioides

K

 Selaginella kaernbachii 
 Selaginella kalbreyeri 
 Selaginella kanehirae 
 Selaginella karimatae 
 Selaginella karowtipuensis 
 Selaginella keralensis 
 Selaginella kerstingii 
 Selaginella ketra-ayam 
 Selaginella kittyae 
 Selaginella kivuensis 
 Selaginella kochii 
 Selaginella kouytcheensis 
 Selaginella kraussiana 
 Selaginella kriegeriana 
 Selaginella krugii 
 Selaginella kunzeana 
 Selaginella kurzii 
 Selaginella kusaiensis

L

 Selaginella labordei 
 Selaginella lacerata 
 Selaginella lanceolata 
 Selaginella landii 
 Selaginella latifolia 
 Selaginella latupana 
 Selaginella lauterbachii 
 Selaginella laxa 
 Selaginella laxifolia 
 Selaginella lebongtandaiana 
 Selaginella lechleri 
 Selaginella ledermannii 
 Selaginella leonardii 
 Selaginella leoneensis 
 Selaginella lepida 
 Selaginella lepidophylla 
 Selaginella leptophylla 
 Selaginella leucobryoides 
 Selaginella leucoloma 
 Selaginella leveriana 
 Selaginella lewalleana 
 Selaginella limbata 
 Selaginella lindenii 
 Selaginella lindhardtii 
 Selaginella lineariformis 
 Selaginella lineolata 
 Selaginella lingulata 
 Selaginella llanosii 
 Selaginella lobbii 
 Selaginella longiaristata 
 Selaginella longiciliata 
 Selaginella longipes 
 Selaginella longipinna 
 Selaginella longirostris 
 Selaginella longissima 
 Selaginella longistrobilina 
 Selaginella lonko-batu 
 Selaginella loriai 
 Selaginella ludoviciana 
 Selaginella lutchuensis 
 Selaginella luzonensis 
 Selaginella lyallii 
 Selaginella lychnuchus

M

 Selaginella macilenta 
 Selaginella macrathera 
 Selaginella macroblepharis 
 Selaginella macrostachya 
 Selaginella magnafornensis 
 Selaginella magnifica 
 Selaginella mairei 
 Selaginella mannii 
 Selaginella marahuacae 
 Selaginella marginata 
 Selaginella marinii 
 Selaginella marosensis 
 Selaginella martensii 
 Selaginella maxima 
 Selaginella mayeri 
 Selaginella mazaruniensis 
 Selaginella megalura 
 Selaginella megaphylla 
 Selaginella megastachya 
 Selaginella melanesica 
 Selaginella mendoncae 
 Selaginella menziesii 
 Selaginella meridensis 
 Selaginella mickelii 
 Selaginella microdendron 
 Selaginella microdonta 
 Selaginella microphylla 
 Selaginella microtus 
 Selaginella miniatospora 
 Selaginella minima 
 Selaginella minutifolia 
 Selaginella mittenii 
 Selaginella mixteca 
 Selaginella moellendorffii 
 Selaginella molleri 
 Selaginella molliceps 
 Selaginella mollis 
 Selaginella monodii 
 Selaginella monospora 
 Selaginella monticola 
 Selaginella moraniana 
 Selaginella moratii 
 Selaginella morgani 
 Selaginella moritziana 
 Selaginella mortoniana 
 Selaginella mosorongensis 
 Selaginella moszkowskii 
 Selaginella mucronata 
 Selaginella mucugensis 
 Selaginella muelleri 
 Selaginella muscosa 
 Selaginella mutica 
 Selaginella myosuroides 
 Selaginella myosurus 
 Selaginella myriostachya

N

 Selaginella nana 
 Selaginella nanophylla 
 Selaginella nanuzae 
 Selaginella neblinae 
 Selaginella neei 
 Selaginella negrosensis 
 Selaginella neocaledonica 
 Selaginella × neomexicana 
 Selaginella neospringiana 
 Selaginella nipponica 
 Selaginella nivea 
 Selaginella njamnjamensis 
 Selaginella nothohybrida 
 Selaginella novae-guineae 
 Selaginella novae-hollandiae 
 Selaginella novoleonensis 
 Selaginella nubigena 
 Selaginella nummularia 
 Selaginella nummulariifolia

O

 Selaginella oaxacana 
 Selaginella obtusa 
 Selaginella opaca 
 Selaginella orbiculifolia 
 Selaginella oregana 
 Selaginella orizabensis 
 Selaginella ornata 
 Selaginella ornithopodioides 
 Selaginella osaensis 
 Selaginella ostenfeldii 
 Selaginella ovifolia 
 Selaginella oviformis

P

 Selaginella padangensis 
 Selaginella palauensis 
 Selaginella pallescens 
 Selaginella pallida 
 Selaginella pallidissima 
 Selaginella palmiformis 
 Selaginella palu-palu 
 Selaginella panurensis 
 Selaginella papillosa 
 Selaginella parishii 
 Selaginella parkeri 
 Selaginella parviarticulata 
 Selaginella parvifolia 
 Selaginella paxii 
 Selaginella pedata 
 Selaginella pellucidopunctata 
 Selaginella pennata 
 Selaginella pentagona 
 Selaginella permutata 
 Selaginella perottetii 
 Selaginella perpusilla 
 Selaginella peruviana 
 Selaginella pervillei 
 Selaginella petelotii 
 Selaginella phanotricha 
 Selaginella phiara 
 Selaginella philippina 
 Selaginella philipsonii 
 Selaginella phillipsiana 
 Selaginella picta 
 Selaginella pilifera 
 Selaginella pilosula 
 Selaginella plagiochila 
 Selaginella plana 
 Selaginella plumieri 
 Selaginella plumosa 
 Selaginella poeppigiana 
 Selaginella polita 
 Selaginella polymorpha 
 Selaginella polyptera 
 Selaginella polystachya 
 Selaginella popayanensis 
 Selaginella poperangensis 
 Selaginella porelloides 
 Selaginella porphyrospora 
 Selaginella posewitzii 
 Selaginella potaroensis 
 Selaginella praestans 
 Selaginella praetermissa 
 Selaginella prasina 
 Selaginella presliana 
 Selaginella pricei 
 Selaginella procera 
 Selaginella producta 
 Selaginella prolifera 
 Selaginella proniflora 
 Selaginella propinqua 
 Selaginella prostrata 
 Selaginella protensa 
 Selaginella proxima 
 Selaginella pruskiana 
 Selaginella pseudopaleifera 
 Selaginella pseudovolkensii 
 Selaginella psittacorrhyncha 
 Selaginella pubens 
 Selaginella puberulipes 
 Selaginella pubescens 
 Selaginella pubimarginata 
 Selaginella pulcherrima 
 Selaginella pulvinata 
 Selaginella pygmaea

Q

 Selaginella qingchengshanensis 
 Selaginella quadrifaria 
 Selaginella quadrivenulosa

R

 Selaginella radiata 
 Selaginella radicata 
 Selaginella raiateensis 
 Selaginella ramosii 
 Selaginella ramosissima 
 Selaginella rasoloheryi 
 Selaginella raynaliana 
 Selaginella rechingeri 
 Selaginella reflexa 
 Selaginella reineckei 
 Selaginella remotifolia 
 Selaginella repanda 
 Selaginella reticulata 
 Selaginella revoluta 
 Selaginella rhodostachya 
 Selaginella ribae 
 Selaginella ridleyi 
 Selaginella rivalis 
 Selaginella robinsonii 
 Selaginella rodriguesiana 
 Selaginella roesickeana 
 Selaginella rolandi-principis 
 Selaginella roraimensis 
 Selaginella rosea 
 Selaginella rossii 
 Selaginella rostrata 
 Selaginella rothertii 
 Selaginella rotundifolia 
 Selaginella roxburghii 
 Selaginella royenii 
 Selaginella rugulosa 
 Selaginella rupestris 
 Selaginella rupincola 
 Selaginella rzedowskii

S

 Selaginella sajanensis 
 Selaginella sakuraii 
 Selaginella salazariae 
 Selaginella salinoi 
 Selaginella saltuicola 
 Selaginella sambasensis 
 Selaginella sambiranensis 
 Selaginella sandvicensis 
 Selaginella sandwithii 
 Selaginella sanguinolenta 
 Selaginella sarawakensis 
 Selaginella sartorii 
 Selaginella scabrida 
 Selaginella scabrifolia 
 Selaginella scalariformis 
 Selaginella schaffneri 
 Selaginella schatteburgiana 
 Selaginella schefferi 
 Selaginella schiedeana 
 Selaginella schizobasis 
 Selaginella schlechteri 
 Selaginella schultesii 
 Selaginella schumannii 
 Selaginella sechellarum 
 Selaginella seemannii 
 Selaginella selaginoides 
 Selaginella selangorensis 
 Selaginella sellowii 
 Selaginella sematophylla 
 Selaginella semicordata 
 Selaginella sepikensis 
 Selaginella sericea 
 Selaginella serpens 
 Selaginella serratosquarrosa 
 Selaginella serrulata 
 Selaginella sertata 
 Selaginella sespillifolia 
 Selaginella setchellii 
 Selaginella shabaensis 
 Selaginella shakotanensis 
 Selaginella siamensis 
 Selaginella sibirica 
 Selaginella silvestris 
 Selaginella simplex 
 Selaginella simpokakensis 
 Selaginella sinensis 
 Selaginella singalanensis 
 Selaginella sinuosa 
 Selaginella smithiorum 
 Selaginella sobolifera 
 Selaginella societatis 
 Selaginella solomonii 
 Selaginella soneratii 
 Selaginella soyauxii 
 Selaginella spanielema 
 Selaginella sparsifolia 
 Selaginella speciosa 
 Selaginella squamulosa 
 Selaginella squarrosa 
 Selaginella stauntoniana 
 Selaginella stellata 
 Selaginella stenophylla 
 Selaginella steyermarkii 
 Selaginella stipulata 
 Selaginella stolleana 
 Selaginella stomatoloma 
 Selaginella striata 
 Selaginella strigosa 
 Selaginella strobiformis 
 Selaginella suavis 
 Selaginella subalpina 
 Selaginella subcalcarata 
 Selaginella subcordata 
 Selaginella subdiaphana 
 Selaginella subisophylla 
 Selaginella subrugosa 
 Selaginella subserpentina 
 Selaginella subspinulosa 
 Selaginella subsplendens 
 Selaginella substipitata 
 Selaginella subtrisulcata 
 Selaginella subvaginata 
 Selaginella suffruticosa 
 Selaginella sulcata 
 Selaginella sungemagneana 
 Selaginella surucucusensis

T

 Selaginella tama-montana 
 Selaginella tamariscina 
 Selaginella tanyclada 
 Selaginella tarda 
 Selaginella taylorii 
 Selaginella temehaniensis 
 Selaginella tenella 
 Selaginella tenera 
 Selaginella tenerrima 
 Selaginella tenuifolia 
 Selaginella tenuissima 
 Selaginella tereticaulis 
 Selaginella terezoana 
 Selaginella thomensis 
 Selaginella thurnwaldiana 
 Selaginella thysanophylla 
 Selaginella tomentosa 
 Selaginella torricelliana 
 Selaginella tortipila 
 Selaginella trachyphylla 
 Selaginella trichoclada 
 Selaginella trisulcata 
 Selaginella truncata 
 Selaginella trygonoides 
 Selaginella tuberculata 
 Selaginella tuberosa 
 Selaginella tyleri 
 Selaginella tylophora

U

 Selaginella uliginosa 
 Selaginella umbrosa 
 Selaginella uncinata 
 Selaginella undata 
 Selaginella underwoodii 
 Selaginella unilateralis 
 Selaginella urquiolae 
 Selaginella usterii 
 Selaginella utahensis

V

 Selaginella vaginata 
 Selaginella valdepilosa 
 Selaginella valida 
 Selaginella vanderystii 
 Selaginella vardei 
 Selaginella velutina 
 Selaginella ventricosa 
 Selaginella vernicosa 
 Selaginella versatilis 
 Selaginella versicolor 
 Selaginella vestiens 
 Selaginella vestita 
 Selaginella victoriae 
 Selaginella vieillardii 
 Selaginella viridangula 
 Selaginella viridissima 
 Selaginella viridula 
 Selaginella viticulosa 
 Selaginella vogelii 
 Selaginella volkensii 
 Selaginella volubilis 
 Selaginella vonroemeri

W

 Selaginella wahauensis 
 Selaginella wallacei 
 Selaginella wallichii 
 Selaginella wangpeishanii 
 Selaginella wariensis 
 Selaginella watsonii 
 Selaginella wattii 
 Selaginella weatherbiana 
 Selaginella weinlandii 
 Selaginella whitmeei 
 Selaginella wightii 
 Selaginella willdenowii 
 Selaginella wilsonii 
 Selaginella wolfii 
 Selaginella wrightii 
 Selaginella wurdackii

X

 Selaginella xanthoneura 
 Selaginella xipholepis 
 Selaginella xiphophylla

Y

 Selaginella yemensis 
 Selaginella yunckeri

Z

 Selaginella zahnii 
 Selaginella zartmanii 
 Selaginella zechii 
 Selaginella zollingeriana

References

Selaginella